Brian McCabe may refer to:

 Brian McCabe (political consultant), American political strategist
 Brian McCabe (author), Scottish writer
 Bryan McCabe, Canadian ice hockey player